{{Infobox martial artist
| name            = Cody McKenzie
| other_names     = The AK Kid
| image           = 
| image_size      = 200px
| alt             =
| caption         =
| birth_name      = Cody Steven McKenzie
| birth_date      = 
| birth_place     = Cordova, Alaska, United States
| death_date      = 
| death_place     =
| death_cause     =
| residence       = Metaline, Washington, United States
| nationality     =  American
| height          = 
| weight_lb       = 170
| weight_class    = Welterweight(2014)Middleweight (2014)  Lightweight (2009–2012; 2013)  Featherweight (2007–2009; 2012–2013)
| reach           = 72 in
| style           = 
| stance          = 
| fighting_out_of = Spokane, Washington, United States
| team            = Cesar Gracie Jiu-Jitsu
| rank            = Brown belt in Brazilian jiu-jitsu| years_active    = 2007–2014; 2015–present| mma_kowin       = 1
| mma_subwin      = 15
| mma_decwin      = 1
| mma_koloss      = 4
| mma_subloss     = 4
| mma_decloss     = 2
| mma_dqloss      = 1
| mma_draw        = 
| mma_nc          = 
| sherdog         = 22173
| footnotes       =
| updated         =
}}

Cody Steven McKenzie (born December 16, 1987) is an American mixed martial artist. A professional competitor since 2007, McKenzie mostly competed in his regional circuit, before signing with the Ultimate Fighting Championship to appear on The Ultimate Fighter: Team GSP vs. Team Koscheck, and has also competed for M-1 Global. 

Background
McKenzie was born in Cordova, Alaska and currently trains in Spokane, Washington. He saw his first MMA fight when he was a sophomore at Selkirk High School and knew from then on that he wanted to be an MMA fighter.

McKenzie is a member of the "Fancy Pants Fight Team", named after Lyle Beerbohm. Prior to joining the Ultimate Fighting Championship, McKenzie recorded ten successive submission victories, nine of which were by guillotine choke.

McKenzie also utilizes his own variation of the guillotine choke which he names "The McKenzietine". McKenzie flips his shoulder a different way to the standard guillotine choke, before arching his shoulder. According to Sherdog.com, McKenzie has the third-most guillotine choke victories in the world behind only two fighters who have each had over 50 fights in their respective careers, one being Travis Fulton, the front-runner, who despite having had over 300 fights has only two more guillotine victories than McKenzie.

Mixed martial arts career

Early career
McKenzie began his professional mixed martial arts career with a TKO victory over Brett Held in British Columbia, Canada. This was his only fight to go to a second round in his career prior to the UFC. Less than a month later, McKenzie faced Abe Jones, defeating him via triangle choke in the first round.

After taking almost a year away from competition, McKenzie returned to face Benny Mawson, once again in British Columbia, Canada. After 100 seconds, McKenzie caught his opponent in a guillotine choke, taking his record to 3–0. This began his long stretch of victories via guillotine choke. During this near-record setting span, McKenzie fought several times in B.C. and in various locations in Washington. McKenzie also fought in Bahrain on one occasion, taking just four minutes to defeat his opponent with a guillotine choke. Before signing with the UFC, McKenzie had a record of 11–0, with nine successive first-round guillotine choke finishes.

The Ultimate Fighter
McKenzie signed with the Ultimate Fighting Championship to appear on The Ultimate Fighter: Team GSP vs. Team Koscheck.

McKenzie competed on the debut episode against Amir Khillah, to get into the house. Prior to the fight, Georges St-Pierre predicted a guillotine choke submission victory for McKenzie. This proved to be correct as McKenzie forced a technical submission victory over Khillah in the opening round.

In the second episode, the team picks were made. Georges St-Pierre picked McKenzie as his sixth pick (twelfth overall).

McKenzie was next picked to face Koscheck's number one pick Marc Stevens. Stevens went for an early takedown, but was caught in a guillotine choke submission. With just 18 seconds on the clock, Stevens passed out and McKenzie was declared the winner.

In the quarterfinals, McKenzie faced Nam Phan of Team Koscheck. He lost the fight via TKO in the second round after Phan dropped him with a combo to the body.

Ultimate Fighting Championship
McKenzie made his UFC debut at The Ultimate Fighter: Team GSP vs. Team Koscheck Finale against Aaron Wilkinson. He went on to defeat Wilkinson via submission (a guillotine choke applied to Wilkinson's jaw) at 2:03 of round one. McKenzie earned the Submission of the Night award for his performance.

McKenzie made a quick return to the octagon as he replaced Melvin Guillard to face Yves Edwards at UFC: Fight for the Troops 2 on January 22, 2011. After a back and forth battle that saw both men in control, McKenzie lost the fight via rear naked choke submission in the second round.

McKenzie was expected to face Bart Palaszewski on May 28, 2011, at UFC 130, but was forced off the card with an injury and was replaced by Gleison Tibau.

McKenzie faced Vagner Rocha on September 17, 2011, at UFC Fight Night 25. He lost the fight via submission in the second round.

McKenzie was expected to face Michael Johnson on January 28, 2012, at UFC on Fox 2. However, McKenzie was forced out of the bout with an injury and was replaced by Shane Roller.

McKenzie was expected to face Aaron Riley on May 15, 2012, at UFC on Fuel TV: The Korean Zombie vs. Poirier. However, Riley was pulled from the event and replaced by promotional newcomer Marcus LeVesseur. McKenzie won the fight via submission in the first round.

McKenzie dropped to featherweight and faced Chad Mendes on July 7, 2012, at UFC 148. He lost the fight via first-round TKO.

McKenzie was expected to face Leonard Garcia on December 29, 2012, at UFC 155.  However, McKenzie pulled out of the bout, citing an injury, and was replaced by Max Holloway.

The bout with Leonard Garcia was rescheduled for April 27, 2013, at UFC 159. McKenzie won the fight via unanimous decision, the first decision win of his career.

McKenzie faced Sam Stout in a lightweight bout on December 14, 2013, at UFC on Fox 9. He lost the fight via unanimous decision. During the fight, McKenzie wore basketball shorts with the tag still on them, which UFC president Dana White called "UFC amateur hour." McKenzie was subsequently released from the promotion.

Post-UFC
McKenzie fought at a 180 pound catchweight on April 12, 2014, against Mark Dobie at Battle for the Border 3. He won the fight via rear-naked choke submission.

On October 3, 2014, McKenzie faced Brock Larson in the opening round of the BattleGrounds MMA one-night welterweight tournament. He lost the fight via second-round submission.

On December 18, 2014, McKenzie announced his retirement from mixed martial arts.

Two months after announcing his first retirement, it was announced on February 3, 2015, that McKenzie had signed with WSOF. He faced Andrew McInnes at World Series of Fighting 18: Moraes vs. Hill on February 12, 2015. He lost the fight via disqualification, after a headbutt from McKenzie rendered McInnes unable to continue.

On October 14, 2017, McKenzie fought for Venator, losing by first round TKO to Stefano Paterno. He was later suspended by the Italian MMA commission for refusing to provide a sample to anti-doping officers.

The following year in September 2018, McKenzie was due to face J.D. Domengeaux at a Tuff-N-Uff event. The fight was called off the day before the bout after McKenzie refused to provide a urine sample to anti-doping and then attempted to provide fake urine. In November Mckenzie was suspended by the Nevada Athletic Commission for four years.

Bare knuckle boxing
Cody Mckenzie fought in a bare-knuckle boxing fight with the United Kingdom's BKB-Bare Knuckle Boxing organization, debuting against its most recognized star fighter, undefeated Middleweight Champion Jimmy "Celtic Warrior" Sweeney for the BKB Middleweight World Championship at BKB 4. Sweeney did as many in the bare-knuckle scene expected he would and controlled the fight from start to finish, playing with McKenzie at times and knocking him down 5 times before the fight was eventually stopped via TKO.

Film and television
McKenzie was featured in the mixed martial arts documentary Fight Life.''

Championships and achievements
Ultimate Fighting Championship
Fight of the Night (One time) vs. Yves Edwards 
Submission of the Night (One time) vs. Aaron Wilkinson

Mixed martial arts record

|Win
|align=center|17–11
|Chris Ensley
|Submission (guillotine choke)
|Conquest of the Cage: McKenzie vs. Ensley
|
|align=center|1
|align=center|2:08
|Airway Heights, Washington, United States
|
|-
|Loss
|align=center|16–11
|Stefano Paterno
|TKO (punches)
|Venator FC: Kingdom 1
|
|align=center|1
|align=center|4:59
|Milan, Italy
| 
|-
|Loss
|align=center|16–10
|Joe Riggs
|TKO (submission to punches)
|Z Promotions: Fight Night Medicine Hat 2
|
|align=center|1
|align=center|1:51
|Medicine Hat, Alberta, Canada 
|
|-
|Win
|align=center|16–9
|Valeriu Mircea
|Submission (guillotine choke)
|Venator FC III 
|
|align=center|2 
|align=center|1:30
|Milan, Italy
|
|-
|Loss
|align=center|15–9
|Ryan Machan
|Technical Submission (kimura)
|Fight Night Medicine Hat
|
|align=center|1
|align=center|4:04
|Alberta, Canada
|
|-
|Loss
|align=center|15–8
|David Bielkheden
|Decision (unanimous)
|Superior Challenge 12
|
|align=center|3
|align=center|5:00
|Malmö, Sweden
|
|-
|Loss
|align=center|15–7
|Andrew McInnes
|DQ (headbutt)
|WSOF 18
|
|align=center|1
|align=center|4:57
|Edmonton, Alberta, Canada
|
|-
|Loss
|align=center|15–6
|Beslan Isaev
|KO (knee)
|M-1 Challenge 54
|
|align=center|1
|align=center|2:20
|St. Petersburg, Russia
|
|-
|Loss
|align=center|15–5
|Brock Larson
|Submission (arm-triangle choke)
|BattleGrounds MMA 5: O.N.E.
|
|align=center|2
|align=center|1:43
|Tulsa, Oklahoma, United States
|
|-
|Win
|align=center|15–4
|Mark Dobie
|Submission (rear-naked choke)
|Battle for the Border 3 - Nations Collide
|
|align=center|1
|align=center|2:28
|Cranbrook, British Columbia, Canada
|
|-
|Loss
|align=center|14–4
|Sam Stout
|Decision (unanimous)
|UFC on Fox: Johnson vs. Benavidez 2
|
|align=center|3
|align=center|5:00
|Sacramento, California, United States
|
|-
|Win
|align=center|14–3
|Leonard Garcia
|Decision (unanimous)
|UFC 159
|
|align=center|3
|align=center|5:00
|Newark, New Jersey, United States
|
|-
|Loss
|align=center|13–3
|Chad Mendes
|TKO (body punch)
|UFC 148
|
|align=center|1
|align=center|0:31
|Las Vegas, Nevada, United States
|
|-
|Win
|align=center|13–2
|Marcus LeVesseur
|Submission (guillotine choke)
|UFC on Fuel TV: The Korean Zombie vs. Poirier
|
|align=center|1
|align=center|3:05
|Fairfax, Virginia, United States
|
|-
|Loss
|align=center|12–2
|Vagner Rocha
|Submission (rear-naked choke)
|UFC Fight Night: Shields vs. Ellenberger
|
|align=center|2
|align=center|3:49
|New Orleans, Louisiana, United States
|
|-
|Loss
|align=center|12–1
|Yves Edwards
|Technical Submission (rear-naked choke)
|UFC: Fight for the Troops 2
|
|align=center|2
|align=center|4:33
|Fort Hood, Texas, United States
|
|-
|Win
|align=center|12–0
|Aaron Wilkinson
|Submission (guillotine choke)
|The Ultimate Fighter: Team GSP vs. Team Koscheck Finale
|
|align=center|1
|align=center|2:03
|Las Vegas, Nevada, United States
|
|-
|Win
|align=center|11–0
|Brandon MacArthur
|Submission (guillotine choke)
|AM Ford: Fight Night 2010
|
|align=center|1
|align=center|2:00
|Trail, British Columbia, Canada
|
|-
|Win
|align=center|10–0
|Len Bentley
|Submission (guillotine choke)
|Rumble on the Ridge 6: Regeneration
|
|align=center|1
|align=center|3:04
|Snoqualmie, Washington, United States
|
|-
|Win
|align=center|9–0
|Ryan Farhat
|Submission (guillotine choke)
|Raw Power: MMA
|
|align=center|1
|align=center|4:00
|Sanabis, Manama, Bahrain
|
|-
|Win
|align=center|8–0
|Bobby Sanchez
|Submission (guillotine choke)
|Conquest of the Cage 6
|
|align=center|1
|align=center|0:30
|Spokane, Washington, United States
|
|-
|Win
|align=center|7–0
|Casey Hobson
|Submission (guillotine choke)
|AM Ford: Fight Night 2009
|
|align=center|1
|align=center|2:52
|Trail, British Columbia, Canada
|
|-
|Win
|align=center|6–0
|Jeremy Burnett
|Submission (guillotine choke)
|CageSport MMA
|
|align=center|1
|align=center|2:16
|Tacoma, Washington, United States
|
|-
|Win
|align=center|5–0
|Rob Roy
|Submission (guillotine choke)
|Caged Rage 2
|
|align=center|1
|align=center|0:44
|Castlegar, British Columbia, Canada
|
|-
|Win
|align=center|4–0
|Dennis Parks
|Submission (guillotine choke)
|EWC: Vancouver Cage Fights
|
|align=center|1
|align=center|1:37
|Ridgefield, Washington, United States
|
|-
|Win
|align=center|3–0
|Benny Mawson
|Submission (guillotine choke)
|GFS: Ford Fight Night
|
|align=center|1
|align=center|1:40
|Trail, British Columbia, Canada
|
|-
|Win
|align=center|2–0
|Abe Jones
|Submission (triangle choke)
|PFA: Ultimate Cage Fighting
|
|align=center|1
|align=center|2:09
|Spokane, Washington, United States
|
|-
|Win
|align=center|1–0
|Brett Held
|TKO (punches)
|GFS: Helter Smelter
|
|align=center|2
|align=center|1:15
|Trail, British Columbia, Canada
|

Bare-knuckle boxing record

|Loss
|align=center|0–1
|Jimmy Sweeney
|TKO (Referee Stoppage)
|BKB 4
|
|align=center|3
|align=center|N/A
|London, England, United Kingdom
|For the BKB Middleweight World Championship 
|-

References

External links
 
 

1987 births
American male mixed martial artists
Featherweight mixed martial artists
Lightweight mixed martial artists
Mixed martial artists utilizing Brazilian jiu-jitsu
Living people
Mixed martial artists from Alaska
People from Cordova, Alaska
Sportspeople from Spokane, Washington
Ultimate Fighting Championship male fighters
American practitioners of Brazilian jiu-jitsu